Giuliano Colonna, 1st Prince o Sonnino (Grande de España) (10 December 1671 – 11 April 1732) was an Italian nobleman of the House of Colonna. He was Prince of Galatro and Sonnino, and a Grandee of Spain. In 1688 he married the great heiress Giovanna van den Eynde, from whom he acquired a fortune, the title of Marquess of Castelnuovo, and the Palazzo Zevallos Stigliano.

Life
He was born on December 10, 1671 in Rome, the son of Filippo Colonna, Lord of Sonnino, and his wife Clelia Cesarini.

As a teenager, he was married to the great heiress Giovanna van den Eynde. Through his marriage to her, he acquired the title of Marquess of Castelnuovo, the Palazzo Zevallos Stigliano, a huge art collection, and the greater part of the van den Eynde's fortune, all of which contributed to boost his position.

In 1690, the king of Naples chose him as his ambassador to the Holy See for the traditional presentation of the chinea, the symbolic annual tribute paid by the king of Naples to the pontiff. King Philip V of Spain, sovereign of the kingdom of Naples, granted him the Grandeza de España in 1715.

He died in Naples on April 11, 1732.

Marriage and progeny
He married Giovanna van den Eynde, Marchioness of Castelnuovo by whom he had the following progeny: 
Ferdinando Colonna, 2nd Prince of Sonnino, 3rd Marquess of Castelnuovo
Girolamo Colonna, Knight of Malta
Gennaro Colonna, Knight of Malta
Filippo Colonna
Cleria
Virginia
Lorenzo

References

1671 births
1732 deaths
Colonna family
Italian princes
Grandees of Spain